Switzerland competed at the 2019 World Aquatics Championships in Gwangju, South Korea from 12 to 28 July.

Medalists

Artistic swimming

Switzerland entered 11 artistic swimmers.

Women

 Legend: (R) = Reserve Athlete

Diving

Switzerland entered six divers.

Men

Women

High diving

Switzerland qualified one male high diver.

Swimming

Switzerland entered 12 swimmers.
Men

|}

Women

Mixed

References

World Aquatics Championships
Nations at the 2019 World Aquatics Championships
2019